Packed to the Rafters was an Australian family-oriented comedy drama television program which premiered on the Seven Network on Tuesday 26 August 2008 at 8:30 pm. The show continued on Tuesdays in this timeslot for its entire run. The drama series features a mix of lighthearted comedy woven through the plot. It revolves around the Rafter family facing work pressures and life issues, while also tackling serious social issues. The Logie award winning series was the highest rating to screen on the Seven Network in 2008, and the show was consistently among the top 5 shows of the year throughout its run in Australia.

TV Week announced 2013 that the sixth series of Packed to the Rafters would be the last, with Hugh Sheridan stating, "It's emotional letting go of Rafters – for all of us. It was such an amazing chapter in Aussie TV. I'm really proud we all came back together to send it off." The two-hour finale of Rafters aired on 2 July 2013, and saw the return of Hugh Sheridan, Jessica Marais, Ryan Corr, Jessica McNamee and James Stewart.  Rebecca Gibney said, "The cast, writers and producers have always said that we wanted to keep Rafters as one of the most-watched shows on TV.  If we ever felt like we were losing too many cast members, we needed to end it on a high.  We can say season six winds up an aspect of the Rafter family and there is a sense of finality to it."

A sequel series Back to the Rafters was released on Amazon Prime Video in 2021.

Overview

The first season (2008)
The first season premiered on 26 August 2008.  The season finale aired 24 March 2009.  Season one's storylines included:
 Julie and Dave's 25th wedding anniversary
 Rachel and Nathan & Sammy moving back home
 Ben moving in with Carbo and getting a new flatmate, Mel
 An amateur porn video of Rachel and Daniel released
 Ben and Mel sleeping together and eventually dating
 Rachel's pregnancy and subsequent abortion
 Carbo and Chrissy's forbidden relationship
 Ted moving on from late wife Louise
 The discovery that Julie is pregnant

The second season (2009)
The second season premiered on 30 June 2009.  The season finale aired 24 November 2009.  Season two's storylines included:
 Julie's pregnancy and the birth of baby Ruby
 Ben's heart problems
 Dave meeting his birth mother Chel
 Rachel's romance with electrician (“sparky”) Jake Barton
 Carbo's relationship with his mother's best friend's daughter, Artie
 Chrissy's crush on Dave, the demise of her friendship with Julie, and her departure
 Nathan's infidelity and gambling problems
 Ben and Mel's engagement and marriage
 Dave's vasectomy
 Sammy leaving Nathan

The third season (2010)
The third season premiered on 29 June 2010.  The season finale aired 16 November 2010.  Season three's storylines included:
 Dave meeting his biological father, Tom Jennings
 Nathan and Sammy's separation and her subsequent departure
 Rachel's jealousy of baby sister Ruby
 Nathan donating a kidney to HIV-positive grandmother Chel
 Rachel's new job
 Ben and Mel's fertility troubles
 Carbo meeting a girl, Retta
 Julie making friends with Hamish, who develops a crush on her
 The Rafters meeting Tom's grandson, Coby
 Mel's death
 Chel's departure
 Ben and Nathan's holiday around Australia

The fourth season (2011-2012)
The fourth season premiered on 8 February 2011.  The season finale aired 20 March 2012.  Season four's storylines included:
 The return of Ben and Nathan
 Coby's artistic flare and his outing as an artist by Rachel
 The finalisation of Nathan and Sammy's divorce
 Rachel's departure to New York
 Carbo and Retta's secret marriage
 The development of a friendship between Julie and Donna
 Bree's arrival & her romance with Jake and departure
 Ben's relationship with Donna's daughter Emma
 Tom's departure
 The introduction of Matt, the half-brother of Dave
 Ruby's disappearance
 Ted's new lease on life and becoming a mentor to Cooper
 Nathan's departure

The fifth season (2012-2013)
The fifth season premiered on 17 April 2012.  The season finale aired 16 April 2013.  Season five's storylines included:
 The introductions of new electrician Frankie Calasso and Julie's boss Adam Goodman
 Coby and Frankie's tumultuous relationship
 The reappearance of Jake's father Jim and his subsequent death
 The end of Ben and Emma's relationship
 Dave's drunken kiss with Frankie and his subsequent marriage troubles
 Retta's pregnancy and miscarriage
 Ben's departure 
 Ted's dementia diagnosis
 The fire in the Rafter household and its aftermath
 Emma moving in with Carbo and Retta
 The arrest of Coby after his assault on Donna's boyfriend (and Dave’s client) Duncan, leading to Coby’s imprisonment and subsequent departure
 Nathan's marriage to Saskia and the birth of their son Edward
 The brief return of Nathan and Ben
 Jake's departure
 Julie and Dave's 30th wedding anniversary

The sixth season (2013)
The sixth and final season premiered on 23 April 2013.  The series finale aired 2 July 2013.  Season six's storylines included:
 The arrival of new sparky and Frankie's old friend Buzz Graham
 Ted's reunion with ex-lover Eleanor McCormack
 Matt moving in with Frankie
 Carbo, Retta and Emma struggling with their florist store
 Buzz taking a liking to Emma
 Emma dating Logan/Craig who has been juggling between Donna and her
 Buzz's son Jackson visiting his dad when he is working and get to know the others
 The sudden death of a customer of Dave Rafter Electrical who was fond of Frankie and Frankie taking care of his greenhouse
 Dave coaching the cricket team
 Nathan calling Sammy for help in his visit to London to look for Saskia
 Saskia cheating on Nathan and her sleep deprivation
 Retta pregnant
 Jake and Rachel getting engaged
 Dave and Julie's holiday around Australia

Cast

Main

Recurring

Guest
Recurring and minor guest stars have included Melanie Vallejo, Lieschen Pogue, Denise Roberts, Phoebe Tonkin, Andy Whitfield, Iain PF McDonald and Bernard Curry. Kate Ceberano and David Campbell have appeared as themselves.

Production
The producer is Jo Porter, who alongside series creator Bevan Lee and writer Anthony Ellis are part of the same team responsible for the critically acclaimed series Always Greener, which also set ratings records.

The exterior shots of the Rafter house are filmed on location in Concord, while most house interiors were shot in studios at the Australian Technology Park, Eveleigh. Most of the other exterior shots are filmed at locations in Southern Sydney including establishing shots at Oatley and Lugarno shopping centres as well as the Captain Cook Bridge. The dinner venue in episode 1 was filmed at the St George Motor Boat Club at Sans Souci but the indoor scenes in the Chinese Restaurant were a set. The cricket match in episode 2 was filmed at Morrisons Park, Putney.  The shopping centre, beach and park scenes in episode 5 were shot in Carss Park. Julie's “Night Club” scenes were shot near Concord, at the Epping Hotel.

Home media
The entire series of Packed to the Rafters has been released on DVD on Region 4 in Australia from Universal Pictures Home Entertainment between 2009 and 2013. A complete series box set was released in 2013. Season two was the only season to receive a Blu-ray release, in addition to its DVD release.

Soundtrack

Volume 1

Packed to the Rafters: The Soundtrack was released on 29 November 2008. It has peaked at No. 7 on the Australian ARIA Albums Chart. It has since gone triple certified Platinum, selling in excess of 170,000 copies. The songs "I'm Yours" and "Rock & Roll" have been heavily used in promotional advertising for the series.

Track listing
 Jason Mraz – "I'm Yours"
 Gabriella Cilmi – "Sweet About Me"
 Josh Pyke – "Memories and Dust"
 Ben Lee – "Love Me Like the World Is Ending"
 Kahn Brothers – "Stronger Together"
 Lisa Mitchell – "Neopolitan Dreams"
 The Cat Empire – "Fishies"
 Old Man River – "La"
 José González – "Down the Line"
 James Reyne – "Reckless"
 Alex Lloyd – "Same Day"
 Lior – "Burst Your Bubble"
 Jenny Morris – "Street of Love"
 Mark Sholtez – "Love Me for the Cool"
 Abby Dobson – "It's Only Love"
 Eric Hutchinson – "Rock and Roll"

Certifications

Volume 2

Packed to the Rafters: The Soundtrack Volume 2 was released on 18 September 2009. It has peaked at No. 30 on the Australian ARIA Albums Chart.

Track listing
 Latch Key Kid – "Good Times"
 Lisa Mitchell – "Coin Laundry"
 Empire of the Sun – "We Are the People"
 Ben Lee – "Birds and Bees"
 Eric Hutchinson – "You Don't Have to Believe Me"
 Bob Evans – "Don't You Think It's Time?"
 Kylie Auldist – "Just Say"
 James Grehan – "Hold On"
 Matt Costa – "Miss Magnolia"
 Mark Sholtez – "Too Late for Heroes"
 Lior – "This Old Love"
 Whitley – "Lost in Time"
 King Curly – "Little Arrows"
 Sarah Blasko – "Perfect Now"
 Abby Dobson – "Horses"
 Rick Price – "Have Yourself a Merry Little Christmas"

Volume 3

Packed to the Rafters: The Soundtrack Volume 3 was released on 4 March 2011.

Track listing
 Uncle Kracker – "Smile"
 Olly Murs – "Please Don't Let Me Go"
 The Potbelleez – "Hello"
 Michael Franti & Spearhead featuring Cherine Anderson – "Say Hey (I Love You)"
 Little Birdy – "Brother"
 Passion Pit – "Little Secrets"
 The Cat Empire – "So Many Nights"
 Kisschasy – "Generation Why"
 Sarah Blasko – "We Won't Run"
 Missy Higgins – "Warm Whispers"
 Bertie Blackman – "Thump"
 Fatboy Slim – "The Rockafeller Skank"
 Sally Seltmann – "Harmony to My Heart Beat"
 Leroy Lee – "Mountain Song"
 Mark Sholtez – "This Perfect Day"
 Angus & Julia Stone – "Hush"
 Daniel Merriweather – "Red"
 Sia – "I Go to Sleep"
 Holly Throsby – "Now I Love Someone"
 The Easybeats – "Wedding Ring"

Reception

Critical response

Packed to the Rafters has received positive critical response from reviewers. In reviewing the pilot, David Knox of TV Tonight underlined that whilst the series's tone was "predominantly light", Rafters "also features some darker, more successful moments". The Age's Jim Schembri called Rafters a "superbly sculpted series about suburban class warfare", noting that in his opinion, the series was "one of the most enjoyable, finely honed locally produced TV dramas we've seen in ages", applauding the dialogue that "crackles with wit and energy". Season 2 received an equal amount of outflowing positivity, with Michael Lallo discovering that "Rafters "lighthearted" tone acts as a cloak, allowing it to address controversial topics without making viewers feel they're being lectured. The result is a feel-good series that's meaty and satisfying".

Of the series's characters, Michael Idato of The Sydney Morning Herald found an "elegance to the performances", going on to further applaud the "gentle, engaging, emotional dynamics" of the characters interactions with each other that also managed to both "enhance its charm and believability at the same time".

Awards and nominations

TV Week Logie Awards
The show was nominated for forty two Logie Awards and won thirteen.

AFI Awards
Packed to the Rafters was nominated for two AFI (now AACTA) Awards in 2009.

Episodes and ratings

The average ratings for Season 1 in 2008 were 1,939,000 making it the No. 1 show of 2008 on Australian television. The second season of Packed to the Rafters averaged 1,881,000, ranking it as No. 2 for the 2009 year. The program has also been picked up by Irish broadcaster RTÉ and New Zealand's TV1 which aired the first season of Packed to the Rafters in early 2009. The series has also been sold to networks in South Africa, Belgium, The Netherlands, several Scandinavian countries, Italy and India.

Series ratings
Packed to the Rafters has been a solid performer in the ratings since its premiere. Most episodes have been the number one programme during prime time for the night since the series premiere and the show has remained in the top ten programs of the week. In 2008, the series was the highest rating regularly broadcast show with an average of 1,939,143 viewers per episode for the first fourteen episodes of season one which screened in 2008. The lower weekly rankings for seasons 5 and 6 are as a result of multiple episodes of single reality shows appearing as separate programs on the weekly list.

Season 1 (2008–2009)

Season 2 (2009)

Season 3 (2010)

Season 4 (2011–2012)

Season 5 (2012–2013)

Season 6 (2013)

Broadcast

Back to the Rafters

In September 2019, it was reported the cast members were in discussion to revive the series for a 2020 season under the working title "Back to the Rafters", however the series would not air on Seven Network, instead would be placed on Amazon Prime Video, which was confirmed in December 2019, and the return of Rebecca Gibney, Erik Thomson, Jessica Marais, Hugh Sheridan, Angus McLaren, Michael Caton and George Houvardas. Filming commenced in Sydney in 2020.

In February 2020, Jessica Marais dropped out of the series for personal reasons. In March 2020, it was announced Georgina Haig would take over the role of Rachel Rafter.

See also
 Always Greener

References

External links

Packed to the Rafters at Australian Television Information Archive

2008 Australian television series debuts
2013 Australian television series endings
Australian comedy-drama television series
English-language television shows
Seven Network original programming
Television series about families
Television series by Seven Productions
Television series by Endemol
Television shows set in New South Wales